Alexandru Iulian Zaharia (born 9 September 2000) is a Romanian professional footballer who plays as a forward for CSM Bacău.

Honours

Dante Botoșani 
Liga III: 2021–22

References

External links
 
 
 Alexandru Iulian Zaharia at lpf.ro

2000 births
Living people
Sportspeople from Iași
Romanian footballers
Association football forwards
Liga I players
FC Politehnica Iași (1945) players
Liga II players
Liga III players
CS Aerostar Bacău players